Tarimichthys is a subgenus of stone loach genus Triplophysa native to China which contains two species. Some authorities recognise Tarimichthys as a valid taxon.

Species
There are currently two recognized species in this genus:

 Triplophysa (Tarimichthys) bombifrons (Herzenstein, 1888)
 Triplophysa (Tarimichthys) edsinica (Prokofiev, 2003)

Maurice Kottelat recognises a third species Tarimichthys incipiens which other authorities consider a subspecies of S. bombifrons.

References

Nemacheilidae
Animal subgenera